The administrative divisions of China between 1912 and 1949 were established under the regime of the Republic of China government.

Introduction 
The Republic of China was founded in 1912. It used most of the same administrative divisions as the Qing dynasty but divided Inner Mongolia into four provinces and set up several municipalities under the authority of the Executive Yuan. After the end of World War II in 1945, Manchuria was reincorporated into the Republic of China as nine provinces. Taiwan and the Penghu were also acquired by the Republic of China and organized into Taiwan Province after Retrocession Day. By this time the top-level divisions consisted of 35 provinces, 12 Yuan-controlled municipalities, one special administrative region and two regions (Outer Mongolia and Tibet). 

After the central government's withdrawal from Mainland China during the Chinese Civil War and subsequent relocation to Taiwan in 1949, the jurisdiction of the ROC was restricted to only Taiwan, the Penghu, Hainan, and a few offshore islands of Fujian and Zhejiang. Hainan was captured by the People's Republic of China in May 1950, followed by the unrecognized Tibet in 1951 and Zhejiang in 1955. The remaining area is called the "Free area of the Republic of China" in the ROC Constitution. In most ordinary legislation, the term "Taiwan Area" is used in place of the "Free Area", while Mainland China is referred to as the "Mainland Area."

Beiyang government (1912–28) 

The Beiyang government streamlined the system used in Qing dynasty down to three levels:

 Provinces (省, shěng)
 Circuits (道, dào)
 Counties (縣, xiàn)

The Beiyang government set up four more provinces out of Inner Mongolia and the surrounding areas (Chahar, Rehe, Ningxia, Suiyuan) and two others out of parts of historical Tibet ( (later Xikang) out of Kham and Qinghai out of Amdo; Ü-Tsang was the Dalai Lama's realm at this time and not part of any province), bringing the total number of provinces up to 28.

Nationalist Government (1928–49) 

The Nationalist government established municipalities (cities directly administered by the central government) and added sub-county levels (like townships.) Circuits were abolished in 1928 as being superfluous. The reforms were impracticable; the average province had more than 50 counties with some with more than a hundred. Some provinces were later subdivided into prefectures.

 Provinces (省, shěng)
 Administrative superintendent district (行政督察區, xíngzhèng dūcháqū)
 Counties (縣, xiàn)

Four northeast provinces (Fengtian, Heilongjiang, Rehel, Jilin) were lost to Manchukuo, a puppet state of the Empire of Japan, in the 1930s. Counties in multiple provinces were lost to the Chinese Soviet Republic in 1931, with most being recovered in 1934 before the Long March.

Following the end of the Second World War in 1945, Manchuria was reincorporated as 9 provinces and 3 municipalities, and Taiwan Province was created by annexing the island of Taiwan and the Penghu islands. By this time there was a total of thirty-five provinces, twelve municipalities  (院轄市, yuànxiáshì), one special administrative region (特別行政區, tèbié xíngzhèngqǖ), and two regions (地方, difāng) as first-level divisions.

China recognized the Mongolian People's Republic following the 1945 Sino-Soviet Treaty of Friendship and Alliance, formally relinquishing claims on the province of Outer Mongolia.

Administrative divisions published after 1949

After its loss of the mainland to the Communist Party in the Chinese Civil War and its retreat to Taiwan in 1949, the Nationalist Party continued to regard the Republic of China as the internationally recognized sole legitimate government of China. The jurisdiction of the Republic was restricted to Taiwan, the Penghu, and a few islands off Fujian, but the Republic of China has never retracted its claim to mainland China. Moreover, the Kuomintang government in Taiwan unilaterally overturned its recognition of Mongolia in 1953. Accordingly, the official first-order divisions of Republic of China remain the historical divisions of China immediately prior to the loss of mainland China and maps of China and the world published in Taiwan sometimes show provincial and national boundaries as they were in 1949, ignoring changes made by the Communist government and including Mongolia, northern Burma (northern Kachin State), and Tannu Uriankhai as part of the Republic. Maps and list of administrative divisions covering above places are currently published although the ROC, as of 1987, retained the pre-1949 mainland municipalities and provinces for statistical purposes.

As of the ROC government suspends publication of relevant administrative codes in 2006, the nominal political divisions of the Republic were 35 provinces, 1 special administrative region, 2 regions, 18 special municipalities (adding Taipei and Kaohsiung to the original list with four added in 2010 and 2014), 14 leagues, and 4 special banners. For second-order divisions, under provinces and special administrative regions, there are counties (2,035), province-controlled cities (56), bureaus (34) and management bureaus (7). Under provincial-level municipalities there are districts, and under leagues there are banners (127).

 Provinces (省, shěng) and Special municipalities (直轄市, zhíxiáshì)
 Counties (縣, xiàn) and Cities (市, shì)

Although the administration of pro-independence President Chen Shui-bian (2000–2008) did not actively claim sovereignty over all of China,  Thus, the claimed area of the ROC continues to include mainland China, several off-shore islands, and Taiwan. However, in 2002, the Democratic Progressive Party (DPP) administration have officially renounced claims to Mongolia.

Beginning in 2006, the ROC Yearbook, under Chen's administration, ceased displaying official administrative divisions in Mainland China. It recognized two provinces (Taiwan and Fujian) and two special municipalities (Taipei and Kaohsiung). President Ma Ying-jeou reasserted the ROC's claim to be the sole legitimate government of China and the claim that mainland China is part of ROC's territory. He does not, however, actively seek reunification, and prefers to maintain an ambiguous status quo in order to improve relations with the PRC. On May 21, 2012, the Mainland Affairs Council released a press announcement that said that Outer Mongolia is not a part of Republic of China. As of 2014, the ROC maps showing the pre-1949 borders are published. 

In 2016, the pre-1949 map of the ROC was installed in the Legislative Yuan which drew the ire of the lawmakers who called for the removal or replacement of a map in the Legislative Yuan which shows Nanjing as the ROC capital, and portrays Mongolia as part of its territory despite its recognition in 2012. Kuomintang legislator William Tseng said that the map is accurate, until the Constitution and laws are amended to change the nation’s official territory while DPP lawmaker Chen Ting-fei stated “With the way it portrays the ROC territory, that map is like one from a parallel universe — it is out of step with current thinking.” 

After the streamlining of Fujian and Taiwan provincial governments in 1956 and 1998, the Tsai Ing-wen administration de facto abolished the Taiwan Provincial Government on 1 July 2018 and the Fujian Provincial Government on 1 January 2019. With the first-level provinces retained under its constitutional structure, the Executive Yuan now administers the second-level 13 counties and 3 provincial cities (autonomous municipalities) in its place alongside with the 6 special municipalities.

See also
 Administrative divisions of the Republic of China
 Physiographic macroregions of China
 Republic of China (1912–1949)

References

External links
Summary of terms
The province in history by John Fitzgerald

Provinces of China
Administrative divisions of China
Former administrative divisions of China